Red Deer—Lacombe is an electoral district in Alberta. It was created in 2012 from the more urbanized southern portion of Wetaskiwin (51%) and the northern portion of Red Deer (49%).

The riding was originally intended to be named Red Deer—Wolf Creek.

Members of Parliament

This riding has elected the following members of the House of Commons of Canada:

Election results

References

Alberta federal electoral districts
Lacombe, Alberta
Politics of Red Deer, Alberta
Ponoka, Alberta